Nine of Wands is a Minor Arcana Tarot card.

Divinatory purposes
This card depicts a figure, weary from battle yet prepared to fight on. Order, discipline and an unassailable position.  Any opposition will be defeated.  Courage in the face of attack or adversity and a stability that cannot be removed.  Good health.

Dignified or Reversed - Lack or inability to give and take.  Projects pursued that are destined to fail because of their impractical nature.  Delays and disarray.  Card could indicate possible poor or ill health.  A secure position that is no longer.  Personality flaws may, in fact, be stepping-stones to the throne of harmony.

Key meanings
The key meanings of the Nine of Wands:
Afraid
Cautious
Defensive
Impermanent Security
Inner strength
Persistence
Resilience

Astrological correspondence

The Nine of Wands is associated to the Moon in Sagittarius.

References

Suit of Wands

https://labyrinthos.co/blogs/tarot-card-meanings-list/nine-of-wands-meaning-tarot-card-meanings